Cyber City is a station of the Rapid Metro Gurgaon that was inaugurated on 7 May 2014. It's owned by Haryana Mass Rapid Transport Corporation Limited (HMRTC) and operated by Delhi Metro Rail Corporation (DMRC). Earlier it was operated by Rapid Metro Gurgaon Limited (RMGL).

The station was named after IndusInd Bank under corporate branding of stations, but the naming rights of the metro station expired in 2019.

The station

Facilities
The station has the following facilities:

ITC Kiosk: 3 kiosks - two on ground level and one in unpaid concourse 
ATM: IndusInd bank ATM in the unpaid concourse
Shop/Office: Royal Mobile, selling mobile accessories in unpaid concourse.

Entry/exits

Nearby places
Cyber City, Gurgaon
Shankar Chowk
Ericsson Building, Gurugram
Udyog Vihar
DLF Gateway Towers, Gurugram
Infinity Towers, Gurugram
Trident Hotel, Gurugram

Connections

References

External links

 
 

Rapid Metro Gurgaon stations
Railway stations in Gurgaon district